The year 2000 in Israel and Palestine marked the beginning of the al-Aqsa Intifada leading to a number of Palestinian and Israeli deaths.

Timeline

January - 28 September
Up to 28 September 12 Palestinian were killed by the Israeli army in the occupied territories.

September

The same day, 5 Palestinians in Temple Mount and a sixth in Ramallah were killed. The first five did not participate in hostilities when killed 
 September 30, 10 Palestinians killed between them, Muhammad Jamal Muhammad a-Dura, a 12-year-old boy killed in the arms of his father near the former settlement of Netzarim
 September 30, Nizar Mahmoud Hasan Aida, 16, of Deir Ammar refugee camp, killed by IDF gunfire to his chest during a peace demonstration at Ayosh Junction.
 September 30, Khaled Adli Bassem al-Bazyan, 14, of Nablus, killed by IDF gunfire to his abdomen during a demonstration on the Nablus-Ramallah road.

October  
 October 1: Several civilian children deaths, Muhammad Nabil Daoud Hamad al-Abasi, 16, of al-Bireh, killed by IDF gunfire to his head during a demonstration at Ayosh Junction. Sara Abdul-Azim Abdul-Haq Hasan, 18 months, of Sarah, near Salfit, killed by Israeli settler gunfire to her head while riding with her father in a car. Samer Samir Sudki Tabanja, 12, of Nablus, killed by IDF helicopter gunfire to his head while watching a demonstration. Sami Fathi Muhammad al-Taramsi, 17, of Gaza City, killed by IDF gunfire to his head during a demonstration at Netzarim Junction. Hussam Naim Hasan Bakhit, 17, of Balata refugee camp, killed by IDF helicopter fire to his head while watching a demonstration. Iyad Ahmad al-Khashishi, 16, of Nablus, died of chest wounds sustained Sept. 30 from IDF gunfire while at a demonstration on the Nablus-Ramallah road.
 October 2: Wael Tayseer Muhammad Qatawi, 14, of Balata refugee camp, killed by IDF gunfire to his chest.
 October 3: Hussam Mahmoud Ismael al-Hamshari, 15, of Tulkarm, died of head wounds sustained Oct. 1 from IDF gunfire during a demonstration. Amr Kahlil Mustafa al-Rifai, 17, of Maghazi refugee camp, Gaza, killed by IDF gunfire to his head and chest during a demonstration at Netzarim Junction.
 October 4: Muhammad Yousef Zayd abu-Asi, 13, of Bani Suheila, Gaza, killed by IDF gunfire to his head, chest and back during a demonstration at Netzarim Junction.
 October 6: Majdi Samir Musa al-Misilmani, 15, of Beit Hanina, near Jerusalem, killed by IDF gunfire to his head during a demonstration. Muhammad Khaled Mahmoud Tammam, 17, of Tulkarm, killed by IDF shelling to his chest.
 October 8: an Israeli settler found dead in Nablus.
 October 10: Aseel Hassan Asleh, 17, of Araba, near Nazareth, Palestinian with Israeli citizenship and an active Seeds of Peace participant, killed by Israeli police gunfire to his neck at close range while at a demonstration near his village.
 October 11: Sami Hasan Salim Silmi Salama, 17, of Tulkarm, killed by IDF gunfire to his chest.
12 October Sami Fathi Abdallah abu-Jazar, 12, of Rafah, Gaza, died of head wounds sustained Oct. 10 from IDF gunfire during a demonstration.
16 October Muayad Usama Ali al-Jawarish, 14, of Aida refugee camp, killed by IDF gunfire to his chest and abdomen while on the way to school.
20 October Muhammad Adel Hasan abu-Tahun, 15, of Tulkarm, killed by IDF gunfire to his head and chest during a demonstration. Samer Talal al-Awaisi, 16, of Qalqilya, killed by IDF gunfire to his chest during a demonstration. Ala Bassam Abdullah Bani-Nimra, 13, of Salfit, killed by IDF gunfire to his head during a demonstration. Thaer Ali Daoud Omar Muala, 17, Amari refugee camp, killed by IDF gunfire to his head during a demonstration at Ayosh Junction.
21 October Omar Ismael Omar al-Buhisi, 16, of Deir al-Balah, Gaza, killed by IDF gunfire to his chest during a demonstration near the Kfar Darom settlement. Majid Ibrahim Hasan Hawamdeh, 15, of al-Bireh, killed by IDF gunfire to his head during a demonstration.
22 October Salahaldeen Fawzi Ahmad al-Nijmi, 15, of Maghazi refugee camp, Gaza, killed by IDF gunfire to his chest during a demonstration near the Kfar Darom settlement. Wael Mahmoud Imad al-Nasheet, 12, of Jabalya refugee camp, Gaza, killed by an IDF rubber-coated bullet to his head during a demonstration near the Erez industrial zone.
23 October Ashraf Ahmad Abdul-Majid al-Habayeb, 15, of Askar refugee camp, died of head wounds sustained Oct. 16 from IDF gunfire during a demonstration. Saed Adnan Abdullah al-Tambour, 17, of Nablus, killed by IDF gunfire to his head while picking olives.
24 October Nidal Muhammad Zuhdi al-Dbeiki, 16, of Gaza City, killed by IDF gunfire to his abdomen during a demonstration near the Erez industrial zone. Iyad Usama Taher Shath, 13, of Khan Younis, killed by an IDF rubber-coated bullet to his head during a demonstration. Ala Muhammad Abdul-Rahman Mahfuz al-Jawabra, 14, of Al-Arroub (camp), died of head wounds sustained Oct. 6 from IDF gunfire while on the terrace of his home one hour after injuring an Israeli soldier with a stone.
27 October 2000 Bashir Saleh Musa Shalawit, 16, of Qalqilya, deaf, killed by IDF gunfire to his abdomen during a demonstration.
29 October 2000 Husni Ibrahim Hasan al-Najjar, 17, of Rafah refugee camp, Gaza, killed by IDF gunfire to his head during a demonstration.
31 October Thaer Ibrahim Shalsh al-Zayd, 17, of Jalazoun refugee camp, killed by IDF gunfire to his abdomen during a demonstration at Ayosh Junction.

November
 November 1: two Israeli soldiers killed in a shooting incident near Bethlehem, and another one while guarding a town in Jordan Valley.   Ahmad Salman Ibrahim abu-Tayeh, 13, of Shati refugee camp, Gaza, killed by IDF gunfire to his head during a demonstration at the Karni checkpoint. Muhammad Ibrahim Muhammad al-Hajjaj, 14, of Gaza City, killed by IDF gunfire to his head and chest during a demonstration at the Karni checkpoint. Ibrahim Riziq Marzuq Omar 15, of Shati refugee camp, Gaza, killed by IDF gunfire to his chest during a demonstration at the Karni checkpoint.
 November 2: two Israeli civilians killed in a car bombing in Jerusalem. The Islamic Jihad claims responsibility.  Khaled Muhammad Ahmed al-Katibw, 17, of Hazma, near Jerusalem, killed by IDF gunfire to his abdomen during a demonstration. Yazen Muhammad Eisa al-Haliqa, 17, of al-Khader, near Bethlehem, killed by IDF gunfire to his head and chest during a demonstration.
 November 3: Rami Ahmad Abdul-Fattah Mutawe, 15, of Hazma, near Jerusalem, killed by IDF gunfire to his abdomen during a demonstration.
 November 4: Hind Nidal Jamil Qauider, 23 days old, of Hebron, killed by IDF gas.
 November 5: Maher Muhammad Ibrahim al-Suedy, 16, of Bureij refugee camp, Gaza, killed by IDF gunfire to his head during a demonstration.
 November 6: Wajdi Alam al-Hattab, 15, of Tulkarm, killed by IDF gunfire to his chest during a demonstration. Muhammad Nawaf Hamad al-Taban, 17, of al-Zawaida, near Deir al-Balah, Gaza, killed by IDF gunfire to his back during a demonstration near the Kfar Darom settlement.
November 7: Ahmad Amin al-Khuffash, 7, of Murda, near Salfit, murdered by an Israeli settler vehicle.
November 8: Ibrahim Fuad Riziq al-Qasas, 16, of Khan Younis, Gaza, killed by IDF gunfire to his head during a demonstration near the Tufah checkpoint. Muhammad Musbah Ismael abu-Ghali, 16, of Khan Younis, Gaza, killed by IDF gunfire to his chest during a demonstration near the Tufah checkpoint. Khaled Fayez Suleiman abu-Zahra, 17, of Nur al-Shams refugee camp, killed by IDF gunfire to his chest and abdomen. Raed Abdul-Majed Muhammad Daoud, 14, of Hares, near Salfit, killed by IDF gunfire to his abdomen during a demonstration. Fares Fayq Odeh, 14, of Gaza City, killed by IDF gunfire to his head while throwing stones near the Karni checkpoint.
 November 10: Usama Mazen Salim Azouka, 14, of Jenin, killed by IDF gunfire to his chest during a demonstration. Usama Samir Abdul-Nabi al-Jirjawi, 17, of Gaza City, killed by IDF gunfire to his chest during a demonstration near the Karni checkpoint.
 November 11: Musa Ibrahim Musa al-Dibs, 15, of Jabalya refugee camp, Gaza, killed by IDF gunfire to his chest during a demonstration near the Erez industrial zone. Basel Hussein abu-Qamer, 15, of Jabalya, Gaza, killed by IDF gunfire during a demonstration near the Erez industrial zone.
November 12: Mahmoud Nafez abu-Naji, 15, of Gaza City, killed by IDF gunfire to his chest during a demonstration.
 November 14: Muhammad Khater Muhammad al-Ajla, 13, of Gaza City, killed by IDF gunfire to his head during a demonstration near the Karni checkpoint. Saber Khamis al-Barash, 15, of Amari refugee camp, killed by IDF gunfire to his chest during a demonstration near the Ayosh Junction.
November 15: Jadou Maneh Jadou abul-Kabash, 16, of al-Samu, near Hebron, killed by IDF gunfire to his abdomen during a demonstration. Ahmad Samir Basal, 15, of Gaza City, killed by IDF gunfire to his chest during a demonstration near the Karni checkpoint. Ibrahim Abdul-Rauf al-Juedy, 17, of Qalqilya, killed by IDF gunfire to his chest and abdomen during a demonstration. Muhammad Nasr Muhammad al-Shurafi, 17, of Gaza City, killed by IDF gunfire to his head during a demonstration near the Karni checkpoint. Jihad Suheil Suleiman abu-Shahmeh, 13, of Khan Younis, killed by IDF gunfire to his head during a demonstration near the Tufah checkpoint.
November 17: Muhammad Abdul-Jalil abu-Rayan, 17, of Halhoul, near Hebron, killed by IDF gunfire to his head during a demonstration on Route 60.
 November 18: an Israeli soldier killed by a senior Palestinian preventive security officer while guarding a settlement in Gaza strip. Another dies of his wounds obtained earlier.
 November 19: Abdul-Rahman Ziad al-Dahshan, 14, of Gaza City, killed by IDF gunfire to his chest during a demonstration at the Karni checkpoint.
 November 20: two adults killed while escorting a school bus in Gaza. 5 children and 4 adults are injured.  Ibrahim Ahmad Hasan Othman, 16, of Rafah refugee camp, Gaza, killed by IDF gunfire to his chest.
 November 21: an Israeli settler youth killed by sniper in Gaza.  Yaser Taleb Muhammad al-Nabtiti, 16, of Tulkarm, killed by IDF gunfire to his chest during a demonstration.
 November 22: two Israeli women killed and 60 civilians wounded in a car bomb attack in Hadera.   Ibrahim Hasan al-Muqanan, 15, of Khan Younis, Gaza, killed by IDF gunfire to his head during a demonstration.
 November 23: Maram Imad Ahmad Hasouna, 3, of al-Bireh, killed by IDF gas near her home. Majdi Ali Abed, 15, of Gaza City, died of head wounds sustained Nov. 17 from IDF gunfire during a demonstration near the Karni checkpoint. Aysar Muhammad Sadiq Hasis, 15, of al-Jalameh, near Jenin, killed by IDF gunfire to his head during a demonstration.
25 November Abdul-Minem Muhammad Izaldeen al-Bosta, 17, of Araba, near Jenin, killed by IDF gunfire to his head during a demonstration.
26 November Mahdi Qasem Jaber, 17, of Qalqilya, killed by IDF gunfire during a demonstration. Muhammad Mansur Nasr abu-Adwan, 16, of Qalqilya, killed by IDF gunfire during a demonstration.
28 November Karam Fathi Shehada al-Kurd, 14, of Rafah, Gaza, died of head wounds sustained Nov. 23 from IDF gunfire during a demonstration near the Rafah border crossing with Egypt.
29 November Muhammad Muhammad Abdallah al-Mashrawi, 14, of Gaza City, died of head wounds sustained Nov. 26 from IDF gunfire during a demonstration near the Karni checkpoint.
30 November Shadi Ahmad Hasan Zhoul, 14, of Husan, near Bethlehem, killed by an Israeli settler vehicle while walking to school. Walid Muhammad Ahmad al-Badan, 17, of Taqou, near Bethlehem, killed by IDF gunfire to his chest during a demonstration near the Tekoa settlement.

December  
 December 1: Muhammad Saleh Muhammad al-Arja, 12, of Rafah, Gaza, killed by Israeli sniper fire to his head near the Rafah border crossing. Medhat Muhammad Subhi Jadallah, 14, of Shati refugee camp, Gaza, killed by IDF gunfire to his head during a demonstration.
 December 5: Ramzi Adel Muhammad Bayatnah, 15, of Abu Qash, near Ramallah, killed by IDF gunfire to his head during a demonstration near the Ayosh Junction.
December 7: Zuhair Mustafa Ali al-Hattab, 17, of Gaza City, died of head wounds sustained Nov. 20 from IDF gunfire during a demonstration near the Karni checkpoint. Mutaz Azmi Ismael Teilakh, 16, of Dheisheh refugee camp, killed by IDF gunfire to his head during a demonstration.
 December 8: An Israeli teacher travelling in a van and the van's driver killed in a drive-by attack in the West Bank. An Israeli soldier killed in a gunfire attack on a civilian bus. Omar Samir Abdul-Hamid al-Mashni, 16, of Beit Our al-Tahta, near Ramallah, killed by IDF gunfire to his head during a demonstration following Friday prayers at Jerusalem’s al-Aqsa mosque.
December 9: Salim Muhammad Salim al-Hameida, 13, of Rafah, Gaza, died of head wounds sustained Dec. 5 from IDF gunfire near the Rafah border crossing.
December 11: Ahmad Ali Darwish al-Qawasma, 14, of Hebron, died of head wounds sustained Dec. 8 from IDF gunfire at close range during clashes.
December 22:Arafat Muhammad Ali al-Jabarin, 16, of Sair, near Hebron, killed by IDF gunfire to his head while throwing stones in Beit Einun.
December 15: Muhammad Farouq Daoud, 17, of Harres, near Salfit, killed by IDF gunfire to his chest while throwing stones near the village checkpoint.
December 20: Hani Yousef Hamid al-Sufi, 14, of Rafah, Gaza, killed by IDF shelling to his head while trying to block the passage of tanks and a bulldozer.
 December 21: an Israeli civilian ambushed and killed near Jerusalem.
 December 28: a soldier and a border police officer killed while dismantling a road-side bomb, by another explosive device, in the Gaza strip. The Islamic Jihad claimed responsibility.
 December 31: Binyamin Zeev Kahane (the son of Meir Kahane) and his wife, Talia killed in an ambush by Palestinian snipers. 5 of their children driving with them injured.  Math Ahmad Muhammad abu-Hadwan, 11, of Hebron, killed by IDF gunfire to his head in Tel Rumeida. Abdul-Rahman Khaled Hammouda Khbeish, 4, of Balata refugee camp, killed by IDF gunfire to his head.

See also
October 2000 events
Israeli casualties of war
house demolition in the Israeli–Palestinian conflict

References

2000 in Israel
2000 in the Palestinian territories
Israeli-Palestinian conflict
2000
2000
2000
2000
Israeli-Palestinian conflict
2000